Colette Codaccioni (born 11 June 1942) is a French politician, and member of the French cabinet.

References

1942 births
Living people
French women in politics
People from Nord (French department)
Politicians from Hauts-de-France
Rally for the Republic politicians